Open book may refer to:

Books and publishing
 An Open Book (poems), a collection by Orson Scott Card
 Open access books
 PEN/Open Book, a program fostering diversity in publishing
 An Open Book, an autobiography by Monica Dickens
 An Open Book, an autobiography by John Huston
 An Open Book, a memoir by Ruth Gordon

Computing and networking
 Openbook (website), a Facebook-specific search engine
 OPeNBooK Co., Ltd., a video game developer
 Networked book, a book designed to be written, edited, and read in a networked environment
 VIA OpenBook, a laptop reference design
 Openbook, an online navigational envelope developed by National Academies Press
 OpenBook, a Freedom Scientific document scanning and reading application for low-vision users.
 OPEN BOOK, a Unicode symbol

TV and radio
 "Open Book" (Steven Universe), an episode of Steven Universe
 "An Open Book," a Six Feet Under episode
 Open Book (radio), a BBC Radio 4 programme about books

Music
 Open Book (Da' T.R.U.T.H. album)
 Open Book (Fatherson album)
 Open Book, an album by Evelyn King
 Open Book, an album by The Lemon Trees
 Songs from an Open Book, an album by Justin Furstenfeld
 Open Book Winter Album, a live album by Justin Furstenfeld
 Open Book, an EP by Jessica Simpson

Songs
 "Open Book," a song by Cake on the album Fashion Nugget
 "Open Book," a song by Gnarls Barkley on the album The Odd Couple
 "Open Book," a song by Ed Harcourt on the album Strangers
 "Open Book," a song by The Rakes on the album Capture/Release; appears in Rayman Raving Rabbids: TV Party
 "Open Book," a song by Cock Robin on the album Collection Gold
 "Open Book," a song by Sacred Reich on the album Independent

Other uses
 Open Book (Tahquitz), a technical rock climbing route at Tahquitz Rock, California
 Open-book accounting
 Open-book contract
 Open book decomposition
 Open-book management
 Open Book, a center for literary and visual arts co-founded by the Minnesota Center for Book Arts
 Open Book, a blog by Amy Welborn
 Open book, a climbing term
 Open book fracture, a type of pelvic fracture

See also
 Open book test